Entropia Universe is a massively multiplayer online (MMORPG) virtual universe designed by the Swedish software company MindArk, based in Gothenburg.

Entropia uses a micropayment business model, in which players may buy in-game currency (PED - Project Entropia Dollars) with real money that can be redeemed back into U.S. dollars at a fixed exchange rate of 10:1. This means that virtual items acquired within Entropia Universe have a real cash value, and a participant may, at any time, initiate a withdrawal of their accumulated PED back into U.S. dollars according to the fixed exchange rate, minus transaction fees. The Entropia Universe is a direct continuation of Project Entropia.

Entropia Universe entered the Guinness World Records Book in both 2004 and 2008 for the most expensive virtual world objects ever sold. The game has been described as dedicated to capitalism rather than quality of gameplay, and connecting the in-game labor with real world profits, in which sense it can be seen as a spiritual precursor to the play to earn model.

Entropia Universe economy 

Entropia Universes in-game currency is the Project Entropia Dollar (PED), which can be purchased for real cash at a fixed rate.  buys 10 PED, and PED can then be converted back to cash in some circumstances.

PED is used to purchase items in the game, such as equipment, clothing, and property.

MindArk charges a 1% fee on withdrawals, and the minimum withdrawal is 1,000 PED.

Gameplay 

The game can be played for free, but spending money on the in-game currency allows significant additional options like purchasing items, skills, deeds/shares, and services from other players. Nearly all of the main in-game activities require expendable resources which must be purchased. Items can also be crafted for use or for sale to other players.

Each player is only allowed one character. Having more than one could cause a player to be banned from the game, losing access to any funds they have spent in the game.

Planets
Entropia Universe (then Project Entropia) was released in 2003 with one planet, named "Calypso".

Starting in 2010, additional planets have been released by MindArk through partnerships with other companies. A second music-themed planet was opened on April 6, 2010, called "ROCKtropia", which is owned and developed by Neverdie Studios. In total there are six planets with different themes. While not a planet, space is a separate area in the Entropia Universe, connecting all planets. Space is developed and managed by MindArk.

Development 
In 1995, development of Entropia Universe (formerly Project Entropia) was started by two different groups - one in Sweden headed by Jan Welter Timkrans and one in Switzerland, headed by Benny Iggland. Initially taking place on the fictional Planet Calypso, the 2001 version used the NetImmerse 4 game engine. On May 20, 2002, the Commercial Open Trial began, and the game was available to the public. With Version Update 4.2 on 28 January 2003, the game was considered "Gold".

Some important additions to the game since release have been:

In August, 2009, Version 10.0 was released, using CryEngine 2 from Crytek. With the new engine, almost everything in the game required changes, including the overall land maps. This change was retconned into the storyline as attacking robots crashing their large spaceship into the planet, changing the land.

Significant events and virtual property sales 

December 14, 2004 – Game creators MindArk announced the conclusion of the first "Treasure Island Sale", a virtual island put up for auction. The winning bidder paid 265,000 PED for the island, the highest price ever paid for a virtual item.
October 24, 2005 – A virtual "asteroid space resort" was bought by Jon "Neverdie" Jacobs for a sum of 1,000,000 PED, surpassing the sale of Treasure Island.
May 2, 2006 – MindArk announced the introduction of an ATM card enabling players to withdraw the real-world currency equivalent of their PED funds directly from any Versatel ATM. It was stated that $165 million had "passed through the game" in 2005 and that this figure was expected to double in 2006.
October 17, 2006 – MindArk announced that Entropia Universe had reached 500,000 registered users.
May 8, 2007 – MindArk announced the results of a "virtual banking license auction". These two-year exclusive licenses aimed to integrate real world banking systems into Entropia Universe, working similarly to real-world banks or pawn shops. Initially, they would be provided with secure systems enabling them to lend money and collect interest, design and name their own virtual bank building(s), and make their own personnel available through avatars. Each winner would be required to add a further  as working capital.

Media

Entropia Universe - Fan magazine

References

External links
 

2003 video games
Massively multiplayer online role-playing games
First-person shooter multiplayer online games
Massively multiplayer online games
Science fiction massively multiplayer online role-playing games
Video games developed in Sweden
Virtual economies
Virtual world communities
Windows games
Windows-only games
CryEngine games
Space massively multiplayer online role-playing games